Cole v. City of La Grange, 113 U.S. 1 (1885), was a United States Supreme Court case in which the court ruled on eminent domain to benefit a private corporation.

Background
The city of La Grange attempted to use eminent domain to condemn property for the benefit of La Grange Iron and Steel Company to expand that served no public benefit.

Decision
The Court held that the Missouri legislature could not authorize  or any other city to issue bonds to assist corporations in their private business. The case was cited in the dissenting opinion of Justice Thomas in Kelo v. City of New London, .

External links 
 
 

United States Supreme Court cases
1885 in United States case law
Takings Clause case law
Lewis County, Missouri
United States Supreme Court cases of the Waite Court